The Zimbabwe national cricket team toured the West Indies from 22 February 2013 to 24 March 2013. The teams played three ODIs, two T20Is, and two Test matches. During the 2nd Test, Chris Gayle scored his 89th six in Test cricket, surpassing Brian Lara's record of 88 sixes for a West Indian cricketer.

Tour matches

University of West Indies Vice Chancellor's XI v Zimbabweans

Three-day: Sagicor High Performance Centre v Zimbabweans

ODI series

1st ODI

2nd ODI

3rd ODI

T20I series

1st T20I

2nd T20I

Test series

1st Test

2nd Test

References

External links

2013 in Zimbabwean cricket
2013 in West Indian cricket
2012–13 West Indian cricket season
International cricket competitions in 2012–13
2012-13